John Gunder Gunderson (June 20, 1942 – January 11, 2019) was a professor of psychiatry at Harvard University and a director at the Borderline center at McLean Hospital.

Education, residencies and fellowships
Born in Two Rivers, Wisconsin, Gunderson graduated from Johns Hopkins College in 1963, received his MBS from Dartmouth Medical School in 1965 and his MD from Harvard Medical School in 1967. Between 1967 and 1971, he was an Intern in Medicine at Hennepin County General Hospital, Resident in Psychiatry at Massachusetts Mental Health Center, and Chief Resident in Psychiatry at Massachusetts Mental Health Center. Between 1971 and 1973, he was a Visiting Candidate at Washington Psychoanalytic Institute, Research Fellow at the Center for Studies of Schizophrenia, Psychiatric Assessment Section of the National Institute of Mental Health, and at the Chestnut Lodge Sanitarium. He was a Resident at Boston Psychoanalytic Institute between 1969 and 1980.

Career
Gunderson led extensive studies of borderline personality disorder. He published nearly 250 papers, 100 reviews and 12 books regarding borderline and other personality disorders. According to Massachusetts General Hospital, his success led to him being called the "father" of borderline personality disorder. He led the academic group that described personality disorders in the fourth edition of the Diagnostic and Statistical Manual of Mental Disorders (DSM). Most recently, he developed a treatment model for borderline personality disorder called Good Psychiatric Management (GPM), intended to guide generalist mental health providers in treating the disorder.  In 2009, McLean Hospital named a treatment center in Cambridge, Massachusetts, after him, called the “Gunderson Residence”. He died on January 11, 2019, at the age of 76 from prostate cancer in Weston, Massachusetts.

in the latter part of his career, Gunderson developed a treatment model called 'Good Psychiatric Management'. This involves research which shows that less intensive, easier-to-learn therapies could be nearly as effective as more developed approaches (DBT and MBT), and would cater for continuing unmet needs often seen in the clinical setting.

Honors and awards
2017: Joseph Zubin Award from the American Psychopathological Association

Personal life

Gunderson was an accomplished artist, with many of his paintings adorning the walls of the Gunderson Residence and offices in the McLean Hospital. He was an avid golfer, gardener, fly fisherman, and played basketball into his 70s.

References

External links
Borderliner Notes - Gunderson, a series of YouTube-clips where Gunderson talks about borderline personality disorder.

1942 births
2019 deaths
Psychiatry academics
Harvard University faculty
Johns Hopkins University alumni
Geisel School of Medicine alumni
Harvard Medical School alumni
McLean Hospital physicians